Organised by the European Bridge League (EBL), the European Champions' Cup is an annual contract bridge competition. Started in 2002, it features the top club team from each competing country.

Open

References

Contract bridge governing bodies
Contract bridge competitions